Frederick Overend Kitching (4 July 1886 – 11 August 1918) was a British athlete. He competed in the men's standing long jump event at the 1908 Summer Olympics. He was killed in action during World War I.

Personal life
Kitching served as an orderly in the Friends' Ambulance Unit during the First World War. He joined the unit after declaring himself a conscientious objector. Serving for two years, Kitching died in a German air raid on Dunkirk in August 1918. He is buried at Dunkirk Town Cemetery.

See also
 List of Olympians killed in World War I

References

External links
 

1886 births
1918 deaths
British male long jumpers
Sportspeople from Darlington
Athletes (track and field) at the 1908 Summer Olympics
Olympic athletes of Great Britain
British casualties of World War I
People associated with the Friends' Ambulance Unit
English conscientious objectors
Deaths by airstrike during World War I